Star Wars Episode I: The Phantom Menace – Original Motion Picture Soundtrack is the film score to the 1999 film of the same name, composed and conducted by John Williams, and performed by the London Symphony Orchestra, London Voices and the New London Children's Choir with orchestrations provided by Conrad Pope and John Neufeld. The soundtrack album was released by Sony Classical Records on May 4, 1999, two weeks before the film's theatrical release. In anticipation of the long-awaited film, the soundtrack was certified Platinum in the United States where it debuted and peaked on the Billboard 200 at number 3, and certified Gold in the United Kingdom, where it entered the UK album charts at number eight.

Three formats were available, and a new one was released in May 2018:

 The original album released on compact disc to accompany the film (May 4, 1999). This release is a single disc containing 17 tracks from the score. Each track is edited by Williams to present the score as one would hear it in a concert suite.
 This album was also available on a two disc vinyl LP set through specialized retailers such as Star Wars Insider.
 The Two-Disc Ultimate Edition released by popular demand (November 14, 2000). This set presents the score predominately as heard in the film (with most of the edits, loops, tracked music, and post-production changes in place). Although not exactly what is heard in the film, this set was meant to be listened to as one would hear the score in the film, but is not the complete score (although it is falsely stated on the back of the set as being 'every note recorded.')
 A special re-issue of the original album to celebrate the film's 3D re-release on February 6, 2012. This version contains the "Duel of the Fates (Dialogue Version)" bonus track originally included on the Ultimate Edition.
 A remastered version of the soundtrack was released by Walt Disney Records on May 4, 2018.

None of the releases contain the entire score. Currently, no complete release has been made. The Album and Ultimate Edition each contain music not featured on the other release. Both sets also contain alternate takes of cues, while neither present some of the alternate takes only heard in the film.

Overview
Recorded in Abbey Road Studios over a week, starting on February 10, 1999, performed by the London Voices and London Symphony Orchestra, Star Wars: Episode I – The Phantom Menace was the first Star Wars score Williams had composed in over 16 years. Williams produced the recording sessions himself with Shawn Murphy recording and mixing the score. Kenneth Wannberg returned as music editor, having fulfilled this task on the previous three Star Wars scores. Several source cues were also composed by Williams' son, Joseph.

The scores of the following two films would rely heavily upon tracking from this score, a decision that Williams and George Lucas had decided upon early into the film's production.

No complete score has ever been released, but the majority of unreleased pieces can be heard in various LucasArts video games.

After the album's release, the popularity of a more complete bootleg version of the score began to steal profits. In response, Sony released the Ultimate Edition, presenting the score nearly as it is heard in the film while falsely marketing itself as "every note ever recorded."

Track listing

The original release of the soundtrack only contained one disc. This is also the same track listing for Walt Disney Records' 2018 reissue.

Released on May 4, 1999.

Release history

Ultimate Edition

Differences between versions
In the recording studio, Williams records cues multiple times. A track's film and album versions can be drastically different. One cue can be made up of several takes, putting together the best moments of each, replacing flubbed notes.

Since each track is run several times, each performance differs slightly. Occasionally, Williams will change orchestrations right on the spot. The score also makes use of several insert pieces which usually replace certain sections within a cue.

Examples of Different Takes:

 Track 4 on Disc 1 of the Ultimate Edition vs. Video Games: The version used in the film cut out the cue's end, which features a snare roll, followed by a cymbal crash, a three-note horn blast followed by a final horn blast/snare hit. The final chord was used instead at the end of "The Droid Invasion". This ending was used in Attack of the Clones as Mace Windu enters the Geonosian arena.
 Track 31 on Disc 1 of the Ultimate Edition vs. DVD vs. Track 7 of the 1-disc album vs video games: The film features loops and extended segments of "The Flag Parade" not featured in the UE. The Album also features a similar loop, as do the video games.
 Track 32 on Disc 1 of the Ultimate Edition vs. Film: The track segues straight into the ending moments of "The Flag Parade", whereas in the film, there is a considerable gap in between. Also, an abridged version of the cue's ending measures have been retained despite not appearing in the film.
 "Take to Your Ships": Take to Your Ships has many different orchestrations heard throughout the UE, the album, earlier and later LucasArts games.
 "Duel of the Fates" many versions: Duel of the Fates has several different orchestrations heard in the games, Album, and Ultimate Edition.
 "Anakin's Theme" vs. Alternate Take: The Alternate take heard in the games has a loud bang in the middle of the track (possibly from an instrumentalist hitting their stand). It also is shorter and eliminates the return to the descending middle segment.

Track listing

Due to the Ultimate Edition portrayal of the score as a film version, and to alleviate long tracks, certain tracks may be several minutes long, but are broken up into segments. When being played, the individual segments are separate tracks. The main track names are in bold and their separate portions follow.

Released on November 14, 2000.

Disc 1

Disc 2

Limited Edition Vinyl Reissue

I Am Shark vinyl re-issue 
I Am Shark reissued the original soundtrack to Star Wars: Episode I: The Phantom Menace on vinyl in late 2014, making it part one of three planned vinyl re-releases of the prequel trilogy soundtracks. The A.V. Club wrote of the I Am Shark vinyl edition:

The album was released in a two-LP format, with limited color versions coordinating with characters and elements from the film:
 Qui-Gon Jinn  — green/brown marble
 Obi-Wan Kenobi — transparent blue
 Darth Maul — black with red and gold stripe
 Hyperdrive — white spatter on black
 Dark Side — 180 gram

Recording Information
During production, several scenes from the final reel were re-edited and re-arranged. Due to this, several recorded cues did not appear in the film, and are instead replaced by Duel of the Fates.

Cue List
 1M2 Main Title
 1M3 The Arrival
 1M4 Gas Leak
 1M4a Droid Fight
 1M5 Queen Amidala
 1M6 The Droid Invasion
 1M7 Introducing Jar Jar
 1M8 The Bubble World
 1M9 Gone Fishing
 2M1 Darth Sidious
 2M1a Monsters Back
 2M2 Theed Palace Arrival
 2M3 You're Under Arrest
 2M3a Take Off
 2M4 Introducing Darth Maul
 2M5 The Arrival at Tatooine
 2M7 I'm A Pilot You Know
 2M10 Stealing Food
 2M11 Through The Slave (Quarters)
 3M1 Running Out of Time
 3M2 Are You A Jedi?
 3M3 Watto's Deal
 3M4 Kids at Play
 3M5 It's Working
 3M6 The Sith Spacecraft
 3M8 Watto's Big Deal
 3M9 The Flag Parade
 3M10 Start Your Engines
 3M11 The Race Begins
 4M1 The Service Ramp
 4M2 Anakin Defeats Sebulba
 4M3 Anakin's Great Victory
 4M5 Anakin Is Free
 4M6 Darth and Qui-Gon
 4M7-8 Naboo Palace
 4M9 The Queen And Palpatine
 5M1 High Council Meeting
 5M2 The Senate Speech
 5M3 Anakin's Test
 5M3 Insert
 5M4-5 The Chosen One
 5M6 More Nute and Rune
 5M7 Moving Forward
 5M8 The Gungans
 5M9 Promoting Jar Jar
 6M1-N The Armies Face-Off
 6M1-Pt.2 The Armies Face-Off
 6M1-X
 6M2 Lazer Fight
 6M2-Pt.2 Lazer Fight
 6M3 Take To Your Ships
 6M3-N Take To Your Ships
 6M4 The Big Army
 6M4a The Fight Begins
 6M5 Droid Battle
 6M6 Up the Wire
 6M7 The Great Dual
 6M7-Pt.2 The Great Dual
 6M8-9 Qui-Gon's Noble End
 6M10 Blowups And The Death Of (Darth Maul)
 6M11-N End of Darth Maul
 7M1 After The Victory
 7M1a Qui-Gon's Funeral
 7M1-N After The Victory
 7M2 The Big Parade
 7M3 End Credits
 7M3 End Credits Insert
 7M3 (Throne Room)
 Anakin's Theme
 Duel of the Fates
 Source 1
 Source 2
 Source 3
 String Cluster

Charts

Certifications

References

External links

Star Wars film soundtracks
John Williams soundtracks
Soundtrack
1999 soundtrack albums
1990s film soundtrack albums
London Symphony Orchestra soundtracks
Albums with cover art by Drew Struzan
Sony Classical Records soundtracks
Walt Disney Records soundtracks